Marie Yolène Raffin (born 14 August 1981) is a Mauritian racewalker. She competed in the women's 20 kilometres walk at the 2004 Summer Olympics.

References

External links
 

1981 births
Living people
Athletes (track and field) at the 2004 Summer Olympics
Mauritian female racewalkers
Olympic athletes of Mauritius
Place of birth missing (living people)